Boochi (Altai: Боочы, Booçı) is a rural locality (a selo) in Ongudaysky District, the Altai Republic, Russia. The population was 262 as of 2016. There are 6 streets.

Geography 
Boochi is located 29 km west of Onguday (the district's administrative centre) by road. Kulada and Bichiktu-Boom are the nearest rural localities.

References 

Rural localities in Ongudaysky District